Hoyito (also known as El Hoyito, Casitas or Mate) is a traditional mancala game played in the Dominican Republic. All the names it goes by are descriptive of elements of the game: "hoyito" means "little hole" (referring to the pits of the board), "casitas" means "houses" (referring to pits containing 4 seeds), and "mate" is the name of the tree whose seeds are used as counters. The game is very similar to Wari.

External links
  Hoyito

Traditional mancala games
Dominican Republic culture